The Dark Side of the Chant is Gregorian's 13th album, released in 2010. It features songs which are originally made by artists varying from AC/DC and the Dutch band Within Temptation to their own work.

Track listing 
 "O Fortuna" (Carl Orff)
 "Stripped" (Depeche Mode)
 "All I Need" (Within Temptation)
 "Hell's Bells" (AC/DC)
 "Born to Feel Alive" (Unheilig)
 "Morning Dew" (Nazareth)
 "My Heart Is Burning" Gregorian original
 "Bring Me to Life" (Evanescence)
 "Dark Side" Gregorian original
 "Frozen" (Madonna)
 "Black Wings" Gregorian original
 "Lucifer" (The Alan Parsons Project)
 "Dark Angel" Gregorian original

2010 albums
Gregorian (band) albums